The 1975 LFF Lyga was the 54th season of the LFF Lyga football competition in Lithuania.  It was contested by 26 teams, and Dainava Alytus won the championship.

Group Žalgiris

Group Nemunas

Final

References
RSSSF

LFF Lyga seasons
1975 in Lithuania
LFF